Ann Stephens (1931–1966) was a British child actress and singer.

Ann(e) Stevens or Stephens may also refer to:

Ann S. Stephens (1810–1886), American novelist
Anne Stephens (Bartimaeus), Bartimaeus character
Anne Stephens (WRAF officer) (1912–2000), Director of British WRAF
Anne Stevens, Hawaiian politician
Anne L. Stevens (born 1948), American businesswoman